Heligmonellidae is a family of nematodes belonging to the order Rhabditida.

Genera

A few genera:
 Acanthostrongylus Travassos, 1937 
 Alippistrongylus Digiani & Kinsella, 2014 
 Brevistriata Travassos, 1937 Guerrerostrongylus Sutton and Durette-Desset, 1991
 Hassalstrongylus Durette-Desset, 1971Nippostrongylus Lane, 1923Odilia Durette-Desset, 1973

References